Elections to Poole Borough Council were held on 1 May 2003, alongside other local elections across the United Kingdom. The Conservative Party won the council from no overall control.

Results

References 

2003 English local elections
1999
21st century in Dorset